Kaleri is a surname. Notable people with the surname include: 

Aleksandr Kaleri (born 1956), Russian cosmonaut
Anna Kaleri (born 1974), German writer and screenwriter